The AVC qualification for the 2006 FIVB Women's Volleyball World Championship saw member nations compete for four places at the finals in Japan.

Draw
11 AVC national teams entered qualification. (Afghanistan later withdrew) The teams were distributed according to their position in the FIVB Senior Women's Rankings as of 15 January 2004 using the serpentine system for their distribution. (Rankings shown in brackets)

First round

First round

Pool A
Venue:  Beilun Sports and Art Center, Ningbo, China
Dates: August 3–7, 2005
All times are China Standard Time (UTC+08:00)

|}

|}

Pool B
Venue:  Ratchaburi Gymnasium, Ratchaburi, Thailand
Dates: August 1–5, 2005
All times are Indochina Time (UTC+07:00)

|}

|}

References

External links
 2006 World Championship Qualification

2006 FIVB Volleyball Women's World Championship
2005 in volleyball
FIVB Volleyball World Championship qualification